{{Infobox beauty pageant
| date = 8 December 2012 
| presenters = Jean-Pierre Foucault
| image = Marine Lorphelin.jpg
| entrants = 33
| placements = 12
| venue = Zénith de Limoges, Limoges, France
| broadcaster = TF1
| debuts= Saint-Martin
| withdrawals =  St-Pierre-et-Miquelon
| winner= Marine Lorphelin
| represented=  Burgundy
| congeniality =  Pauline Llorca Normandy| photogenic =  Emmanuelle Fabre  Languedoc| before = 2012
| next = 2014
}}Miss France 2013 was the 83rd Miss France pageant, held in Limoges on 8 December 2012. Miss France 2012, Delphine Wespiser of Alsace crowned her successor Marine Lorphelin of Burgundy at the end of the event. 

It was the first time that the pageant took place in Limoges and in the Limousin region.

It was presented by the national director Sylvie Tellier and Jean-Pierre Foucault for the 18th consecutive year. The event was broadcast live by TF1.

The winner was Miss Burgundy, Marine Lorphelin, who gave to her region its second Miss France title.

Results

Placements

Preparation
The 33 contestants, Delphine Wespiser and the national director Sylvie Tellier had travelled to Mauritius from November, 15 to November, 22.
The rehearsals took place in Limoges.

 Contestants 

 Special prizes 

 Judges 

 Crossovers 
Contestants who previously competed or will be competing at international beauty pageants:

Miss World
2013:  Burgundy – Marine Lorphelin (1st Runner-Up)
 (Bali)

Miss Universe
2013:  Tahiti – Hinarani de Longeaux 
 (Moscow)

Miss Earth
2013:  Nord-Pas-de-Calais – Sophie Garénaux (Top 16)
 (Muntinlupa)

Miss Supranational
2013:  Martinique''' – Camille René
 (Minsk)

References

External links

2012 in France
December 2012 events in France
Miss France
2012 beauty pageants
Limoges